Edward Holton (September 1, 1844 – August 10, 1907) was a lawyer and political figure in Quebec. He represented Châteauguay in the House of Commons of Canada from 1880 to 1891 as a Liberal member.

He was born in Montreal, Canada East, the son of Luther Hamilton Holton and Eliza Forbes, was educated at McGill University and was called to the Quebec bar in 1867. For a time, he served in the Prince of Wales Rifles. He set up practice in Montreal. Holton was first elected to the House of Commons in an 1880 by-election held after the death of his father and served until his retirement for politics in 1891. In 1873, he married Helen Ford. Holton was managing director and then president of the Herald printing company in Montreal.

Electoral history 
By-election: On Mr. Holton's death, 14 March 1880

References 
 
The Canadian men and women of the time a handbook of Canadian biography, HJ Morgan (1898)
Edward Holton fonds - Library and Archives Canada

1844 births
1907 deaths
Members of the House of Commons of Canada from Quebec
Liberal Party of Canada MPs
McGill University alumni